The Telugu Desam Party (TDP) is an Indian regional political party with great influence in the states of Andhra Pradesh and Telangana. It was founded by the former chief minister of Andhra Pradesh N. T. Rama Rao (N.T.R.) on 29 March 1982 and has focused on supporting Telugu speakers. The party has won a five-time majority in the Andhra Pradesh Legislative Assembly and has emerged as the most successful political outfit in the state's history. It is currently the main opposition party in the Andhra Pradesh Legislative Assembly.

From 1 September 1995, the TDP was led by N.T.R.'s son-in-law and the former chief minister of Andhra Pradesh N. Chandrababu Naidu as president of the party. The headquarters of the party is called N.T.R. Bhavan, which is located at Mangalagiri, Guntur.

Ideology and symbolism
The Telugu Desam Party follows a pro-Telugu ideology. It was founded as an alternative to the Congress hegemony, by emphasizing Telugu regional pride and serving as the party for farmers, backward castes and middle-class people. Since the 1990s, it has followed an economically liberal policy that has been seen as pro-business and pro-development.

The TDP uses yellow as the background colour for the flag with a hut, wheel and plough symbol in the foreground. The party's official symbol is a bicycle.

Health insurance scheme
Since 2014, every active member is eligible for a life insurance policy of ₹2 lakh to be paid to their family in cases of death or permanent total disability, such as the loss of two limbs of eyes, due to accidents, with additional payouts of ₹5,000 per child (up to two) for educational costs. Active members are also reimbursed for up to ₹50,000 to cover hospital treatment from such accidents.

History

NTR Era (1983-1995) 

As a film actor Nandamuri Taraka Rama Rao (NTR) is a well-known name not only to the Telugu people but also to the entire country. On November 18, 1977, near Diviseema in Krishna district of Andhra Pradesh, the sea became turbulent and the Pralaya cyclone that crossed the coast at once caused great destruction to the villages. Thousands of people lost their lives in Horugali and Rakasi waves. The rotting bodies were mass cremated. Officially 14,204 people and unofficially about 50,000 lost their lives in the devastation caused by this typhoon. About 20 thousand acres of crops were damaged. Apart from this, property damage is also estimated to be in crores. People still get excited when they remember that Diviseema was flooded. Film actor NTR, who was shocked by the situation at that time, he took the support of entire film industry by saying that he should stand by the people of Divisea. NTR came to streets and beg everyone to help divisema people. The money donated by people was used to rehabilitate the people of Divisea.

TDP party was founded thinking that we should stand by the people of the state who are struggling with many such problems and put a political party to stand by the people. The party was formed on March 29, 1982 and contested the 1983 elections. The people of Andhra Pradesh, who were fed up with the Congress government which had been ruling for 36 years, gave a great victory to the TDP party in the 1983 elections. On January 9, 1983, NTR was sworn in as the 7th Chief Minister of Andhra Pradesh.

On 16 August 1984, when NTR went to America for the operation, Nadendla Bhaskara Rao, one of the MLAs of the TDP party, took the oath of office with the Governor along with his MLAs as the Chief Minister. On 16 September 1984, NTR along with his MLAs went to Delhi and held a march and dharna against the then Prime Minister Indira Gandhi. Then NTR was once again sworn in as the Chief Minister.

CBN Era (1995 – 2019)

Deepam scheme
A scheme to provide LPG cooking gas connections to rural women created one million LPG connections.

Janmabhoomi Programme 
(First C.M in India to launch it in February 1996)
The Janmabhoomi Programme is designed to involve people in the reconstruction and revitalization of society. It plans to identify problems through Gram Sabha discussions with regional officers, especially in villages. The core concentrated areas are community work, primary school education, drinking water, health and hospitals, family welfare, and environmental protection through watershed and joint forest management activities.
'

HITEC City
In November 1998, Atal Bihari Vajpayee, then prime minister of India, and Chandrababu Naidu inaugurated the HITEC City (nicknamed Cyberabad) by opening the Cyber Towers, a landmark building in Hyderabad.

The Hyderabad Information Technology and Engineering Consultancy City, abbreviated as HITEC City, is an Indian information technology, engineering, health informatics, bioinformatics and business district located in Hyderabad, Telangana, India.

It was commissioned for the promotion of Information Technology in the erstwhile combined state of Andhra Pradesh, by the then Chief Minister N. Chandrababu Naidu, and was inaugurated by the then Prime Minister of India Atal Bihari Vajpayee on 22 November 1998.

It is spread across 81 ha (200 acres) of land including the suburbs of Madhapur, Gachibowli, Kondapur, Manikonda, Nanakramguda and Shamshabad. The combined technology township is also known as Cyberabad.

Cyber Towers was the first tower to be built for the promotion of Information Technology (IT) within 14 months. The attractive, unique design was selected by N. Chandrababu Naidu in 1997 to stand as a monument in the city of Hyderabad and as an architectural masterpiece in the center of Cyberabad, as well as to transform the City of Pearls, Hyderabad into the City of Destiny for IT and Pharmaceutical companies. The city also set up a separate Cyberabad Metropolitan Police Commissionerate and revamped policing under safety and surveillance. HITEC City has emerged as the symbolic heart of cosmopolitan Hyderabad.

E-governance: (First C.M) Launched e-Seva centers in 2001 for paperless and speedy delivery of results to applicants. These e-Seva centers were one-stop solutions providing all government information and services online such as utility bills, banking services, issuing birth and death certificates, written test for drivers licence, government orders, and APSRTC tours and travel operators booking.

Dwakra Mahila Runa Mafi
Helped the DWAKRA Women in the State to waive off their loans.

Post Bifurcation (2014-)

Amaravati

As per the Andhra Pradesh Reorganisation Act, 2014, Hyderabad became the capital of the then newly formed state of Telangana, post bifurcation of Andhra Pradesh. However, Hyderabad would remain as the joint capital of both states for a period not exceeding ten years. Amaravati is a proposed city and the capital of the Indian state of Andhra Pradesh. Chief Minister Sri Nara Chandrababu Naidu envisioned Amaravati to be the people-centric pioneer Smart City of India, built around sustainability and livability principles, and to be the happiest city in the world. The Andhra Pradesh Capital Region Development Authority (APCRDA) was setup to Develop and implement economic development policies for Amaravathi & Capital Region, promote Amaravati & Capital Region for investments from across the globe. Facilitate investments in Amaravati & Capital Region. The Prime Minister of India, Narendra Modi laid the foundation stone at a ceremonial event in Uddandarayunipalem village on 22 October 2015. Among the innovative features on the drawing board are navigation canals around the city and connecting to an island in the Krishna River. The Government has envisaged an investment needed of US$2–4 billion for the development of the city.

The State Government identified the Capital City area between Vijayawada and Guntur cities on the Southern bank of River Krishna upstream of Prakasam Barrage. The Amaravati Capital City has an area of 217.23 km2 and is spread across 25 villages in 3 mandals (Thulluru, Mangalagiri and Tadepalli) of Guntur district. The 25 villages in the Capital City area have about 1 lakh population in about 27,000 households. The Andhra Pradesh State Cabinet meeting passed a resolution of 1 September 2014 to locate the Capital City in a central place of the state, around Vijayawada, and to go for decentralized development of the state with 3 Mega Cities and 14 Smart Cities. The government under the leadership of Sri Nara Chandrababu Naidu, has found a solution to the problem to the troubles of land acquisition in building a new capital city using “Land Pooling” scheme. It is the world's largest successful voluntary land pooling, with 27,956 farmers offering 33,920 acres within three months, launching the project. The city is being designed to have 51% green space and 10% of water bodies, with a plan to house some of the most iconic buildings there. It is being modeled on Singapore, with the master plan being prepared by two Singapore government-appointed consultants.

Mukhyamantri Yuvanestham
Aims to provide financial assistance to unemployed youth.

Pasupu Kumkuma
Aims to provide financial help to women in self-help groups.

Foundation of Amaravati
His ambition was to make Amaravati one of the happiest cities, encompassing the highest standards of livability and infrastructure with a thriving economic environment. It is the world's largest successful voluntary land pooling, with 27,956 farmers offering 33,920 acres within three months, launching the project.

KAPU Videshi Vidya Deevena Scheme
Applicable for members from economically weak families of Kapu Community of Andhra Pradesh who aspire to do their Graduate (only MBBS), Post Graduate, MS or Ph.D. Courses abroad. Financial assistance of Rs 1,000,000 (Rs Ten Lakh) shall be granted to the selected applicants through the prescribed process.

Irrigation projects
Completed 9 irrigation projects like gandikota, thotapalli, pattiseema, gollapalli, purushottama patnam, muchumarri project, siddapur project, remaining 7 projects will coompleted by ending of 2018.
Krishna Godavari delta Pattiseema project completed in 1 year.
Polavaram project works are restarted in and almost 80% of work done. If that project completes, it can serve water for all over state.
Handri-Neeva project completed the first phase and distributing water to rayalaseema. Second phase work also completed by around 70%.
Godavari -Penna interlinking project phase 1 started. With this Guntur and Prakasham can get enough water.
ROADS

Cyclone Hudhud

Cyclone Hudhud is brutally hit the city of Visakhapatnam in 2014. Chandrababu Naidu swore to rebuild the city and urged the central government to decalre it a natural calamity.

Poverty reduction

ANNA Canteens serve breakfast, lunch and dinner at Rs 5 to common man

The state government is setting up 203 Anna Canteens in 110 municipalities. Pensions increased from 1000 to 2000 rupees. Rythu Runa Mafi Yojana: Farm loan waiver scheme under which the Andhra Pradesh state government has waived-off farmers loan in the state under 3 phases. NTR Sujala has been implemented in various places across the state where clean water is made accessible at very low cost of only Rs. 2 for 20 Litres of Water.

In 2017, Bill Gates again met Naidu at Vishakhapatnam, Addressing the valedictory of the three-day AP AgTech Summit 2017, the co-chair of Bill and Melinda Gates Foundation where he recalled that he was really excited at meeting Andhra Pradesh Chief Minister N. Chandrababu Naidu for the first time over 20 years ago. Gates visited the exhibition stalls in the summit along with Andhra Pradesh chief minister. The summit focused on innovative ideas, technologies and global best practices to push agricultural transformation in the state.

Lok Sabha election history
The total number of Lok Sabha seats in (previously undivided) Andhra Pradesh (1956-2014) was 42. After the 2014 bifurcation of the state, there are 25 Lok Sabha seats in Andhra Pradesh and 17 Lok Sabha seats in Telangana. The National United Front was formed with N. T. Rama Rao as chairperson. Under the leadership of Chandrababu Naidu the NDA government was formed with Atal Bihari Vajpayee as the Prime Minister of India. The TDP had G. M. C. Balayogi as the 12th Speaker of the Lok Sabha. TDP was the second largest party in 1984 Indian General Elections, winning 30 seats with 4.31% of votes, thus achieving the distinction of becoming the first regional party to become a national opposition party. However, in the next election they were reduced to only 2 seats out of 42 contested, which has to this day remained the biggest defeat for the party.

Legislative election history

List of Chief Ministers
Chief Minister of Andhra Pradesh

List of Union Ministers

Leadership

Presidents

National General-Secretary
Currently, there are 4 National General Secretaries. The youngest person in the history of TDP to hold this position is Ram Mohan Naidu Kinjarapu, followed by Nara Lokesh,

Notes

References

External links

 

 

 
Political parties established in 1982
1982 establishments in Andhra Pradesh
Liberal parties in Asia
Liberal parties in India
Regionalist parties in India
Populist parties
Social liberal parties